Beta Comae Berenices (β Comae Berenices, β Com) is a main sequence dwarf star in the northern constellation of Coma Berenices. The Greek letter beta (β) usually indicates that the star has the second highest visual magnitude in the constellation. However, with an apparent visual magnitude of 4.3, this star is actually slightly brighter than α Comae Berenices. It can be seen with the naked eye, but may be too dim to be viewed from a built-up urban area.

The star is similar to the Sun, being only slightly larger and brighter in absolute magnitude. It has a stellar classification of G0 V, compared to G2 V for the Sun. The effective temperature of the outer envelope is 5,936 K, giving it a yellow hue of a G-type star. In terms of age it is younger than the Sun, being about 3 billion years old.

Observations of short term variations in the chromatic activity suggest that the star undergoes differential rotation, with a rotation period of about 11–13 days. Its surface has a measured activity cycle of 16.6 years, compared to 11 years on the Sun. It may also have a secondary activity cycle of 9.6 years. At one time it was thought that this star might have a spectroscopic companion. However, this was ruled out by means of more accurate radial velocity measurements. No planets have yet been detected around it, and there is no evidence of a dusty disk.

The habitable zone for this star, defined as the locations where liquid water could be present on an Earth-like planet, is 0.918–1.96 AU, where 1 AU is the average distance from the Earth to the Sun.

See also
 List of star systems within 25–30 light-years

References

External links
 SolStation entry

Comae Berenices, Beta
Coma Berenices
G-type main-sequence stars
Comae Berenices, Beta
Comae Berenices, 43
114710
064394
4983
0502
BD+28 2193